Class 61 may refer to:
DRG Class 61 - a class of streamlined German tank locomotives
JNR Class C61 - a class of Japanese 4-6-4 locomotives
JNR Class D61 - a class of Japanese 2-8-4 locomotives
KTM Class 61 - a class of Malaysian 4-car diesel multiple units